Maestra is a 33-minute documentary film directed by Catherine Murphy, about the youngest women teachers of the 1961 Cuban Literacy Campaign.

In 1961, Cuba aimed to eradicate illiteracy in one year. It sent 250,000 volunteers across the island to teach reading and writing in rural communities for one year. 100,000 of the volunteers were under 18 and more than half of them were women.

In 2004, Murphy discovered that she knew several women in Havana who had volunteered for the project; they were in their 60s. Murphy was due to return to the United States, but before doing so, she decided to record three interviews with former Literacy Campaign volunteers. From 2004 to 2010, Murphy continued to track down stories of Literacy Campaign volunteers and the families that hosted them, eventually producing and directing Maestra and founding The Literacy Project.

The film is narrated in English by Pulitzer Prize–winning author Alice Walker and features Spanish-language interviews (with English subtitles) with nine of the women who taught in the Campaign. Maestra features interviews with Norma Guillard, one of the first Cuban women to call herself a feminist, and Diana Balboa, one of the first open members of Cuba's LGBT community and an international advocate for gay and lesbian rights. Both were 15 years old at the time of the campaign.

Accolades
Maestra premiered in the United States in April 2011 with two screenings in San Francisco, CA.

The film has won the following awards:
 Black Maria Film Festival, winner Director's Choice Award
 Ojai Film Festival, Honorable Mention

Maestra has screened at the following film festivals:

 Workers Unite! Film Festival, New York City, NY, USA, May 2014
 Workers Film Festival, San Diego, CA, USA, 2014
 Sarasota Film Festival, Sarasota, FL, USA, April 2014
 New Hampshire Film Festival, Portsmouth, NH, USA, 2013
 Los Angeles Latino International Film Festival, Los Angeles, CA, USA, 2013
 Louisville's International Festival of Film, Louisville, KY, USA, 2013
 New York African Diaspora International Film Festival, New York City, NY, USA, 2013
 Raindance Film Festival, London, UK, 2012
 LA Femme International Film Festival, Los Angeles, CA, USA, 2012.
 Legacy Media Institute International Film Festival, Petersburg, VA, USA as part of the Traveling Caribbean Showcase, 2013
 Traverse City Film Festival, Traverse City, MI, USA, 2012

Distribution
Maestra is distributed by Women Make Movies, a nonprofit organization founded in 1971 to address the under-representation and misrepresentation of women in media that facilitates the production, promotion, distribution, and exhibition of independent films by and about women.

References

External links
 
 
 Maestra on Women Make Movies
 An interview with director Catherine Murphy from Festival de Cine Global
 

Documentary films about Cuba
2011 short documentary films
2011 films
Documentary films about education
Education in Cuba
1961 in Cuba
American short documentary films
Literacy
2010s American films